Radyo Katipunan (87.9 MHz) is a low-power FM campus radio station owned and operated by the Jesuit Communications Foundation in coordination with the Ateneo de Manila University. Its studio is located at Sonolux Building along Seminary Drive, with its transmitter located within the university's Loyola campus; both are found in Katipunan Ave., Loyola Heights, Quezon City. Radyo Katipunan serves as a community station of the Ateneo campus. Radyo Katipunan airs Monday to Friday from 6:00 AM to 6:00 PM (except holidays or class suspensions due to inclement weather conditions), including semestral breaks.

History
In October 2016, the Ateneo de Manila University was granted a temporary broadcast permit by the National Telecommunications Commission with its broadcast equipment donated by Ateneo alumnus and KBP Corporate Secretary Jose Yabut.

In the 3rd quarter of 2017, the ADMU began its test broadcast at 87.9 MHz under the tentative name Ateneo Campus Radio.

In February 2018, the ADMU began its actual broadcast under the Radyo Katipunan banner, with its soft launch scheduled on February 14, coinciding both Ash Wednesday and Valentine's Day.

On August 28, 2018, Radyo Katipunan was officially launched, with the addition of simulcasting (another Catholic-run station) Veritas 846 during mornings. In addition, the station provided news updates from Rappler and Voice of America.

See also
 DZUP 1602
 DLSU Green Giant FM
 UST Tiger Radio
 Ateneo de Manila University

References

Ateneo de Manila University
Radio stations in Metro Manila
College radio stations in the Philippines
Radio stations established in 2017